Roman Sergeyevich Kostomarov (born 8 February 1977) is a Russian former ice dancer. With partner Tatiana Navka, he is the 2006 Olympic champion, two-time World champion (2004–05), three-time Grand Prix Final champion (2003–05), and three-time European champion (2004–06).

Career 
Kostomarov began skating at the age of nine and a coach put him in ice dancing at eleven. He won the 1996 World Juniors Championships with Ekaterina Davydova.

Kostomarov began competing with Tatiana Navka during the 1998–99 season. They were coached by Natalia Linichuk. They won the bronze medal at the Russian Championships and were sent to the World Championships in their first season together, placing 12th. Linichuk then dissolved the team and paired Kostomarov with Anna Semenovich. He competed with Semenovich during the 1999–2000 season.

In mid-2000, Kostomarov called Navka and asked to skate with her again. They were coached by Alexander Zhulin in New Jersey. Navka/Kostomarov won the World title in 2004 and again in 2005. They also won three European titles from 2004–2006. They then won gold at the 2006 Winter Olympics in Turin, Italy. Navka/Kostomarov retired from competition after the Olympics but continue to skate in shows together.

Kostomarov has skated with celebrity partners in Russian ice shows such as Ice Age. In 2008, Kostomarov played the role of figure skater Viktor Molodtsov in the TV series Hot Ice.

Personal life 
Kostomarov married Austrian ladies' champion Julia Lautowa in June 2004. Their relationship ended in divorce. In April 2014, he married Russian ice dancer Oksana Domnina. Their daughter, Anastasia, was born on 2 January 2011. Their son, Ilya, was born in January 2016.

Political views
He supported the candidacy of Gennady Zyuganov in the 2012 presidential election.

On 24 February 2022, Kostomarov expressed support for Russia's invasion of Ukraine. In December 2022, the Ukrainian Parliament sanctioned Kostomarov for his support of the war.

Health 
On January 10, 2023, Kostomarov was hospitalized with severe pneumonia. He was on ECMO and mechanical ventilation, which led to impaired peripheral circulation.

On February 6, 2023, an operation was performed, the purpose of which was to remove necrosis and stop the process of cell death. As noted, the dead part of the tissue was cleaned from one leg, and the affected area turned out to be large on the second, and the ankle had to be completely amputated; later second foot was also amputated.

Programs 
(with Navka)

Competitive highlights
GP: part of Champions Series from 1995; renamed Grand Prix in 1998.

With Navka

With Semenovich

With Davydova

References

External links

Official website of Tatiana Navka / Roman Kostomarov
Care to Ice Dance? – Navka / Kostomarov

Russian male ice dancers
Olympic figure skaters of Russia
Figure skaters at the 2002 Winter Olympics
Figure skaters at the 2006 Winter Olympics
Living people
Olympic gold medalists for Russia
Figure skaters from Moscow
1977 births
Olympic medalists in figure skating
World Figure Skating Championships medalists
European Figure Skating Championships medalists
World Junior Figure Skating Championships medalists
Medalists at the 2006 Winter Olympics
Goodwill Games medalists in figure skating
Season-end world number one figure skaters
Competitors at the 2001 Goodwill Games
Competitors at the 1997 Winter Universiade
Russian male television actors
Sanctioned due to Russo-Ukrainian War